Five Chord Stud is an album by jazz saxophonist/composer Julius Hemphill recorded in 1993 for the Italian Black Saint label.

Reception
The Allmusic review by Scott Yanow awarded the album 4½ stars stating "The generally fascinating music rewards repeated listenings but one has to have an open mind before putting it on".

Track listing
All compositions by Julius Hemphill
 "Band Theme" - 5:38 
 "Mr. Critical" - 3:44 
 "Shorty" - 6:49 
 "Mirrors" - 5:49 
 "Five Chord Stud" - 13:46 
 "The Moat and the Bridge" - 7:20 
 "Georgia Blue" - 5:48 
 "Flush" - 7:51 
 "Spiritual Chairs" - 7:12
Recorded at Sear Sound in New York City on November 18 & 19, 1993

Personnel
Julius Hemphill - conductor, composer
Tim Berne - alto saxophone 
Marty Ehrlich - soprano saxophone, alto saxophone
Sam Furnace - soprano saxophone, alto saxophone
James Carter - tenor saxophone
Andrew White - tenor saxophone
Fred Ho - baritone saxophone

References 

Black Saint/Soul Note albums
Julius Hemphill albums
1993 albums